In mathematics and statistics, sums of powers occur in a number of contexts:

Sums of squares arise in many contexts. For example, in geometry, the Pythagorean theorem involves the sum of two squares; in number theory, there are Legendre's three-square theorem and Jacobi's four-square theorem; and in statistics, the analysis of variance involves summing the squares of quantities.
Faulhaber's formula expresses  as a polynomial in n, or alternatively in term of a Bernoulli polynomial.
Fermat's Last Theorem states that  is impossible in positive integers with k>2.
The squircle is the case  .
Euler's sum of powers conjecture (disproved) concerns situations in which the sum of n integers, each a kth power of an integer, equals another kth power.
The Fermat-Catalan conjecture asks whether there are an infinitude of examples in which the sum of two coprime integers, each a power of an integer, with the powers not necessarily equal, can equal another integer that is a power, with the reciprocals of the three powers summing to less than 1.
Beal's conjecture concerns the question of whether the sum of two coprime integers, each a power greater than 2 of an integer, with the powers not necessarily equal, can equal another integer that is a power greater than 2. 
The Prouhet–Tarry–Escott problem considers sums of two sets of kth powers of integers that are equal for multiple values of k.
A taxicab number is the smallest integer that can be expressed as a sum of two positive third powers in n distinct ways.
The Riemann zeta function is the sum of the reciprocals of the positive integers each raised to the power s, where s is a complex number whose real part is greater than 1.
The Lander, Parkin, and Selfridge conjecture concerns the minimal value of m + n in 
Waring's problem asks whether for every natural number k there exists an associated positive integer s such that every natural number is the sum of at most s kth powers of natural numbers.
The successive powers of the golden ratio φ obey the Fibonacci recurrence:

Newton's identities express the sum of the kth powers of all the roots of a polynomial in terms of the coefficients in the polynomial.
The sum of cubes of numbers in arithmetic progression is sometimes another cube.
The Fermat cubic, in which the sum of three cubes equals another cube, has a general solution.
The power sum symmetric polynomial is a building block for symmetric polynomials.
The sum of the reciprocals of all perfect powers including duplicates (but not including 1) equals 1.
The sums of three cubes cannot equal 4 or 5 modulo 9, but it is unknown whether all remaining integers can be expressed in this form.
 The sums of powers Sm(z, n) = zm + (z+1)m + ... + (z+n−1)m is related to the Bernoulli polynomials Bm(z) by (∂n−∂z) Sm(z, n) = Bm(z) and (∂2λ−∂Z) S2k+1(z, n) = Ŝ′k+1(Z) where Z = z(z−1), λ = S1(z, n), Ŝk+1(Z) ≡ S2k+1(0, z).
The sum of the terms in the geometric series is

See also

 Sum of squares
 Sum of reciprocals
 Diophantine equation

Number theory
Mathematics-related lists
Squares in number theory

References